This list of treaties contains known agreements, pacts, peaces, and major contracts between states, armies, governments, and tribal groups.

Before 1200 CE

1200–1299

1300–1399

1400–1499

1500–1599

1600–1699

1700–1799

1800–1899

1900–1999

2000-Present

Pending
 Central American Free Trade Agreement
 Free Trade Area of the Americas
 Substantive Patent Law Treaty (SPLT)
 WIPO Protection of Broadcasting Organizations
 Anti-Counterfeiting Trade Agreement

Notes

References

External links
 Treaty of Peace with Japan Signed at San Francisco on 8 September 1951
 Treaty of Peace Between Japan and India (1952) 
 Treaty of Peace Between Japan and the Union of Burma (1954) 
 Agreement Between Japan and Thailand Concerning Settlement of "Special Yen Problem" (1955) 
 Reparations Agreement Between Japan and the Republic of the Philippines (1956) 
 Treaty of Peace Between Japan and the Republic of Indonesia (1958) 
 Reparations Agreement Between Japan and the Republic of Vietnam (1959) 
 Agreement of 21st September, 1967, Between Japan and the Republic of Singapore 
 Agreement of 21st September, 1967, Between Japan and Malaysia 
 Joint Communique of the Government of Japan and the Government of the People's Republic of China (1972)
 China and Russia sign border pact on Dec 9th, 1999

Political timelines
 
History of diplomacy